A hudd was a sentry box shaped shelter used by Anglican clergymen in the past during the final part of a  funeral. It was for them to stand in as they stood at the graveside when inclement weather posed a threat to their wigs.

References

Church architecture
Funerals in the United Kingdom